The Unemployment Act 1934 was an Act of Parliament in the United Kingdom, reaching statute on 28 June 1934. It reduced the age at which a person entered the National Insurance scheme to 14 and made the claiming age 16 years.  It also separated benefits earned by paying National Insurance and those purely based on need.  To do this, it established two bodies: the Unemployment Insurance Statutory Committee to deal with unemployment benefits earned by payment of National Insurance when in work; and the Unemployment Assistance Board to provide means-tested payments for those not entitled to such benefits. The 1934 Unemployment Act also restored the previous 10% cut in unemployment benefits, brought in after the 1931 May Committee. This was due to a reduction in the number of those unemployed in the UK, which was reduced partially due to the creation of the Iron and Steel Federation in 1934 and the introduction of the National Grid in 1933.

Basis for the Act 
In order to pass the Unemployment Act, Sir Henry Betterton (Minister of Labour at the time), based his bill on a set of principles. Betterton divided the bill into three separate parts, each of which had a distinct set of principles.

Part 1: Insurance 
 That the scheme should be financed by contributions from the workers, employers and the State.
 That benefit should be dependent upon contributions
 That the scheme should be maintained on a solvent and self-supporting basis.

Part 2: Eligibility 
 That assistance should be proportionate to need.
 That a worker who has been long unemployed may require assistance other than, and in addition to, cash payments.
 That the State should accept general responsibility for all the industrial able-bodied unemployed outside insurance, within, of course, the limits of a practical definition.

Part 3: Transition 
Part III of the Bill dealt with the transitory provisions—for the transition from the existing arrangements to the amended insurance scheme and the new assistance scheme.

References

Insurance legislation
United Kingdom Acts of Parliament 1934
1934 in economics
Unemployment in the United Kingdom
Welfare state in the United Kingdom